Tsimafei Andreevich Marozaw (Belarusian: Цімафей Андрэевіч Марозаў), or Timofey Andreevich Morozov (Russian: Тимофей Андреевич Морозов; born 1 October 1998), better known by his stage name Tima Belorusskih, is a Belarusian singer and songwriter. He began his solo career as Samzanov, before releasing his first single as Tima on 3 May 2017. His 7th single, Wet Sneakers (Russian: Мокрые кроссы), was his first big hit, reaching 35th on the Apple Music Top 100 in Russia for 2018 and winning the HEAT music award for Hit of the Year. Throughout his entire career, he has been signed to the small Belarusian record label Kaufman Label.

In 2019, Tima released his first album, Your First Disc is my Cassette (Russian: Твой первый диск – моя кассета), and was later nominated for the RU.TV Powerful Start award.
1111
On 23 November 2019, he was awarded a Russkoye Radio Golden Gramophone at the 2019 Golden Gramophone awards.

Biography 

Tsimafei Andreevich Marozau was born on 1 October 1998, in the Belarusian capital of Minsk. His mother, a music teacher, and his father, an opera soloist, allowed Tima to be exposed music from a young age. His mother often played the music of English bassist Sting, while his father enjoyed guitarist and pianist Leonid Agutin. His father also regularly sang and played their piano. From 3 years old, after his parents' divorce, his father brought him on his tours in Germany every summer.

According to Tima, he had always had an interest in music. As such, at 6, Tima's parents took him to a music school and presented him with different instruments, where he settled on playing the cello. Though he never engaged in sport professionally, he was especially fond of football during his time in primary school before slowly losing interest and moving further to music. He had also spent time working selling ice-cream and as a dockworker, and, at the time of releasing Wet Crosses, a server at a restaurant.

After completing primary school, Tima began attending the Belarusian State Academy of Music, though he soon after moved to a linguistics college. After completing school, he started to study for an art degree, though he only attended for under a semester. Throughout his attendance at school, he achieved high grades.

In 2016, Tima's current record label, Kaufman Label, were holding auditions in the Minsk club Re: Public. While Tima performed, only one of the three judges voted for him. After reviewing auditions from other applicants, and selecting two different artists, the label's administrator told the judges to listen to his single RASSVET. They liked it, though felt it "had to be rewritten". Eventually, they contacted Tima at 2am to bring him into the studio.

His stage name, Tima Belorusskih, was chosen as he wanted to stay associated with Belarus, even while popular in other countries.

Personal life 
Tima has said that he tries to keep his personal life separate from his music career, and as such he is rarely seen together with his girlfriend. However, in 2019, the Russian newspaper SUPER announced that he has a daughter, Sofia, who was born in 2015. At the time, Tima was 16 years old and his partner, Yana, was 17.

Discography

Albums

Singles and EPs

References

1998 births
Living people
21st-century Belarusian male singers
Belarusian rappers
Musicians from Minsk